The 2000–01 French Rugby Union Championship was the top level of French club rugby in 2000–01. The competition was played by 21 teams. It was the last French season before the top level was reorganized into a 16-team league known as Top 16, now known as Top 14.

In the first phase, two pools (one of 10 teams, one of 11) were played. The first 4 of each pool were admitted to the "top 8", the tournament for the title.

The last two of the pool containing 10 teams, and the last three of the other, were relegated directly to the second division. 
The 8th team in each pool had a play-off to determine the sixth team relegated. Only one club was promoted from the second division in order to reduce the number of clubs for next session to 16.

Toulouse won their 15th title, beating Montferrand in the final

Preliminary phase

Pool 1 

Bourdeaux-Begles classified 7th for better score in the direct matches with Pau

Pool 2 

(**) Colomiers classified 4th for better score in the direct matches with Narbonne and Dax

(***)La Rochelle classified 7th for better score in the direct matches with Grenoble

Quarters of final

Semifinals

Final

Relegation play-off

External links
 LNR.fr

French rugby union championship
Championship
Fra